Cattigara is the name of a major port city located on the Magnus Sinus described by various antiquity sources. Modern scholars have linked Cattigara to the archaeological site of Óc Eo in present-day Vietnam.

Ptolemy's description

Cattigara was the name given by the 2nd-century Alexandrian geographer Claudius Ptolemy to the land on the easternmost shore of the Indian Sea at (due to a scribal error) 8½° south of the Equator.

The name "Cattigara" was probably derived from the Sanskrit Kirti-nagara कीर्ति- नगर "Renowned City" or Kotti-nagara कोटि-नगर "Strong City".

Scholarship has determined that Ptolemy's Cattigara was at 8½° north of the Equator and was the forerunner of Saigon as the main port and entrepot at the mouth of the Mekong.

John Caverhill deduced in 1767 that Cattigara was the Mekong Delta port Banteaymeas (now Hà Tiên), not far from Óc Eo. The plea in 1979 by Jeremy H.C.S. Davidson for "a thorough study of Hà-tiên in its historical context and in relation to Óc-eo" as indispensable for an accurate understanding and interpretation of the site, still remains unanswered.

The 18th-century French geographer, Jean-Baptiste Bourguignon d'Anville, located Cattigara at the mouth of the Mekong (Cottiaris) River, where it is shown on his map, Orbis Veteribus Notus (The World Known to the Ancients).

The Swedish yachtsman and writer Björn Landström also concluded, from the sailing directions given by the ancient merchant and seafarer Alexander, that Cattigara lay at the mouth of the Mekong.

The "father of Early Southeast Asian history", George Coedès, has said: "By the middle of the 3rd century Fu-nan had already established relations with China and India, and it is doubtless on the west coast of the Gulf of Siam that the furthest point reached by Hellenistic navigators is to be found, that is the harbour of Kattigara mentioned by Ptolemy". A.H. Christie said in 1979 that "the presence of objects, however few in number, from the Roman Orient" added some weight to the conjecture that Óc Eo was the Ptolemaic Cattigara. The distinguished German classical scholar, Albrecht Dihle, supported this view, saying:
From the account of the voyage of Alexander referred to by Ptolemy, Kattigara can actually be located only in the Mekong delta, because Alexander went first along the east coast of the Malacca peninsula, northward to Bangkok, from thence likewise only along the coast toward the south east, and so came to Kattigara. We hear nothing of any further change of course. In addition, at Óc Eo, an emporium excavated in the western Mekong delta, in the ancient kingdom of Fu-nan, Roman finds from the 2nd century after Christ have come to light.

Adhir Chakravarti concluded: "The archaeological remains unearthed at Oc-Eo to the south of Phnom Bà Thên in the Trans-Bassac region of Cochin-China have proved beyond doubt that it was a great port of Fou-nan and, as suggested by Mallaret and Coedès may be identified with Ptolemy's Kattigara emporium (= Skt Kirtinagara or Kottanagara)".

Columbus' search for Ciamba
Guided by Ptolemy, the discoverers of the New World were initially trying to find their way to Cattigara. On the 1489 map of the world made by Henricus Martellus Germanus, revising Ptolemy's work, Asia terminated in its southeastern point in a cape, the Cape of Cattigara. Writing of his 1499 voyage, Amerigo Vespucci said he had hoped to reach Malacca (Melaka) by sailing westward from Spain across the Western Ocean (the Atlantic) around the Cape of Cattigara into the Sinus Magnus ("Great Gulf") that lay to the east of the Golden Chersonese (Malay Peninsula), of which the Cape of  Cattigara formed the southeastern point. The Sinus Magnus was the actual Gulf of Thailand.

Christopher Columbus, on his fourth and last voyage of 1502–1503, planned to follow the coast of Champa southward around the Cape of Cattigara and sail through the strait separating Cattigara from the New World, into the Sinus Magnus to Malacca. This was the route he thought Marco Polo had gone from China to India in 1292. Columbus planned to meet up with the expedition sent at the same time from Portugal around the Cape of Good Hope under Vasco da Gama, and carried letters of credence from the Spanish monarchs to present to da Gama. On reaching Cariay on the coast of Costa Rica, Columbus thought he was close to the gold mines of Champa. On 7 July 1503, he wrote from Jamaica: "I reached the land of Cariay...Here I received news of the gold mines of Ciamba [Champa] which I was seeking".

See also
 Dragon's Tail (peninsula)

References

Lost ancient cities and towns 
 History of Southeast Asia
Funan
Ancient Greek geography